Time of the Transference (1986) is a fantasy novel by American writer Alan Dean Foster. The book follows the continuing adventures of Jonathan Thomas Meriweather who is transported from our world into a land of talking animals and magic. It is the sixth book in the Spellsinger series.

Plot introduction
Nothing is forever in the magical world Jon-Tom has found himself trapped in and as such the duar he uses to create his music-based magic breaks after a battle to save Clothahump from a group of house burglars. He does this by accidentally stepping on a fallen left behind battle axe, cutting himself, and falling back onto the duar and breaking it.

The need to find an expert capable of repairing the rare instrument sets Jon-Tom off on another adventure where he and his friend the otter Mudge search for a repair shop for his instrument, along the way they encounter pirates, cannibals, talkative porpoises, a flying horse who is scared of heights and a beautiful female otter, Weegee, who becomes the target of Mudge’s amorous intentions.

On the way, Jon-Tom accidentally finds a way back to Earth - to Texas, to be exact - and some of the anthropomorphic animals of his new world, including some very nasty characters, cross over as well. After some unpleasant experiences with American criminals and police, Jon-Tom takes the unequivocal decision to go back to what he realizes is now his true home.

External links

Alan Dean Foster homepage

1986 American novels
American fantasy novels
Novels by Alan Dean Foster
Spellsinger series
Phantasia Press books